Yu Shan or Yushan, also known as Mount Jade, Jade Mountain, or , and known as Mount Niitaka during Japanese rule, is the highest mountain in Taiwan at  above sea level, giving Taiwan the 4th-highest maximum elevation of any island in the world. It is the highest point in the western Pacific region outside of the Kamchatka Peninsula. Yushan and its surrounding mountains belong to the Yushan Range. The area was once in the ocean; it rose to its current height because of the Eurasian Plate's movement over the Philippine Sea Plate.

The mountains are now protected as the Yushan National Park. The national park is Taiwan's largest, highest, and least accessible national park. It contains the largest tract of wilderness remaining on the island.

Names
The name derives from its appearance in the winter, when its thick snow cover is thought to make its peak look like stainless jade. "Yushan" or Jade Mountain was also the name of a location in ancient Chinese mythology, a paradise said to be the home of the Queen Mother of the West.

During the Qing Dynasty, Yushan was known in Chinese as Mugangshan ("Wooded Mountain") from its surrounding forests. Other Chinese names included Batongguan, transcribing its native Tsou name "Patungkuonʉ"; Baiyushan ("White Jade Mountain"); and Xueshan ("Snowy Mountain"). It was previously known in English as  a name sometimes mistakenly thought to honor the missionary Robert Morrison, but simply the name of an American captain who sighted it.

Other native names for the mountain include Saviah and Tongku Saveq (Bunun; the latter means "highest peak"), Tanungu'incu (Kanakanavu), and Kanasian (Paiwan).

Geography and geology

The island of Taiwan is situated at the intersection of two tectonic plates – the Eurasian Plate and the Philippine Sea Plate. Even as “recently” as the late Paleozoic (some 250 million years ago), the land here was still but a sedimentary seabed layered with silt and sand.

Yushan is also notable in containing the highest point on the Tropic of Cancer and the only point on that circle of latitude where there is any evidence of Quaternary glaciation.

Hiking
With panoramic views, overlapping mountains, and deep, plunging valleys, Yushan National Park is well known for its scenery, sunrises, sunsets, geological features, and views of the clouds from above. Sea of clouds often fill the valleys. Indisputably, Yushan itself is the focal point of the park.

Yushan is one of the favorites among Taiwanese mountain climbers. International peak baggers Yushan is ranked as the 4th World Island Highpoints and the 3rd Asian Island Highpoints. After Puncak Jaya in Indonesia and Mount Kinabalu in Malaysia to form an "Asian Trilogy" hiking experience.

Yushan has five main peaks with the Main Peak being the most popular:
 Main Peak (玉山主峰), 
 Eastern Peak (玉山東峰),  –  from Main Peak
 Northern Peak (玉山北峰),  –  from Wind Tunnel (風口)
 Southern Peak (玉山南峰),  –  from Paiyun Lodge (排雲山莊)
 Western Peak (玉山西峰),  –  from Paiyun Lodge (排雲山莊)

The east, west, north, and south peaks surround the main summit. The south peak is a sharp pinnacle of black shale. The relatively accessible west side of Yushan is covered with thick forests. The north peak is part of a long, gently-rising ridge; this peak consists of two high points that resemble a camel's humps. The North Peak is also home to Taiwan's highest permanently occupied building, the Yushan Weather Station, where the occasional visitors are warmly welcomed.

Flora and fauna 

Taiwan, with the tropic of Cancer across the center of the island, has a climate between tropical and subtropical. Here low elevation areas support evergreen broadleaved forests. As elevation increases, evergreen broadleaved forests are gradually replaced by deciduous forests and coniferous forests. At mountain peaks with alpine conditions, only mosses, liverworts and occasionally grasses can be found on the ground.

Because of these wide climatic and vegetation variations, this environment nurtures the richest and most diversified wildlife in Taiwan. Preliminary investigations reveal that there are 130 species of birds, 28 species of mammals, 17 species of reptiles, 12 species of amphibians, and 186 species of butterflies in Yushan National Park. In fact, Yushan is nicknamed "the ark" by academics who see it as a repository of Taiwan's rare species. It is almost an encyclopedia of Taiwan's ecological systems, a geological museum and an important habitat of one-third of Taiwan's endemic species, such as:
 Formosan serow (台灣長鬃山羊)
 Reeves's muntjac (台灣山羌)
 Formosan black bear (台灣黑熊)
 Formosan blue magpie (台灣藍鵲)
 Formosan rock macaque (台灣獼猴)
 Hemimyzon taitungensis (台東間爬岩鰍) and Varicorhinus tamusuiensis (Oshima) – Two unique fish species living in the Lekuleku River area.

History
Under the Qing Dynasty, W. Morrison, captain of the American steam freighter Alexander, sighted the mountain while departing from Anping Harbor (present-day Anping, Tainan) in 1857. His log was the first western mention of the mountain, which took his name in European accounts. European mountaineers couldn't access the mountain at the time due to hostile relations of local aborigines to both Qing authorities and Europeans.

Under the Japanese, the anthropologists Torii Ryūzō and Ushinosuke Mori became the first people recorded to summit the mountain in 1900. They gave it the name  which was used as the name of the Niitaka Arisan National Park  in 1937. The Imperial Japanese Navy also used the mountain's name in its "Go" signalNIITAKAYAMANOBORE 1208 ( [Kanji: ]), meaning "Climb Mount Niitaka 1208"to begin the surprise attack against the USN Pacific Fleet and its base at Pearl Harbor, Hawaii, on 7 December 1941 (8 December [1208] in Japanese calendar). 

The Yushan weather station on the north peak was finished in 1943.

Under the Republic of China, a large bronze statue of Yu Youren was placed on the Yushan summit in 1966. The statue was cut down and thrown into a ravine by activists for Taiwan independence in 1996.

In recent years, Yushan has played an important role in a new focus on Taiwan's identity. Because of its iconic status, Yushan has been chosen to be the background of the newly-issued NT$1,000 notes on 20 July 2005. Similarly, a newly-found asteroid by Lulin Observatory of National Central University was named after Yushan on 28 December 2007.

Climate
Yushan has an alpine climate (Köppen ETH). The tip of Yushan is usually covered with frost from November to March. The first snow may appear in October and completely melts by May. Snow falls 24.3 days per year on average on Yushan, and the number is gradually decreasing.
It rains an average of 140 days per year, with the greatest frequency between May and August. From May until the first part of June is plum rain season or monsoon season. Taiwan's typhoon season roughly falls between July and September.

Gallery

See also

 100 Peaks of Taiwan
 List of mountains in Taiwan
 List of islands by highest point
 Yushan National Park
 Yushan Range
 Yushan-class landing platform dock
 Green Jade

Notes

References

Citations

Bibliography

 .
 .

External links

 Taiwan Review
 Yushan Scenic Beauty
 2007 trip report and climbing information
 Book on the first ascent (German)
 Yushan Main Peak Trail Introduction

Mountains of Taiwan
Landforms of Nantou County
Highest points of countries